The Woolston Memorial Hospital  was a Christian hospital in China and the first of its kind in Fuzhou.

History
The Woolston Memorial Hospital was formed from the expansion of a small Fuzhounese clinic run by a Methodist missionary within the walled city. It was located near Crow Pagoda Park in Gulou. Originally, the hospital only accepted members of Christian churches to study on the medical course, however this rule was lifted in 1906 and a standard exam was put in place. Of the four girls to pass the exam in 1906, three were not Christian.

In 1907, the head physician was forced to rest due to serious illness and it was suggested that the hospital should be closed. However, the physicians sister insisted that the hospital remain open for the public and its reputation slowly recovered under her management.

As a Christian hospital, the Woolston held regular services and sought to convert its patients and visitors. A report made to the Foochow Woman's Conference of the Methodist Episcopal Church in 1915 records 30 new baptisms, 20 new full church members, and a total of 1,252 women who had been taken to the nearby church. The staff also campaigned against foot-binding and made an annual report of the number of women who had been persuaded to unbind their feet.

In January 1927, thieves broke into the hospital and set fire to it. The entire building was burnt down.

A Woolston Memorial Dispensary opened in 1930 in Longtian village and at the Lucie F. Harrison Hospital, both in neighbouring Fuqing.

Capacity
The table below shows the number of in-patients and home-visits attended by Woolston hospital staff over 16 years of Hü King Eng's management.

Notable staff
 Hü King Eng
 Hü Seuk Eng, younger sister of Hü King Eng and one of the first local Fuzhounese to train at Woolston

References

Notes

Works cited

Hospitals established in 1899
Christian hospitals
Hospitals in China
History of medicine in China